Auguste Fabre may refer to:

Auguste Louis Antoine Fabre (1820–1878), a French magistrate
Auguste Marie Fabre (1833–1922), a French industrialist